Fuck, That's Delicious (also known by the censored title F*ck, That's Delicious or simply That's Delicious) is an American television food documentary series starring rapper, and former chef, Action Bronson. The series premiered on March 3, 2016, on Viceland. The series focuses on "the life and eating habits of rap's greatest bon vivant".

Fuck, That's Delicious follows Action Bronson as he travels around the world, visits various restaurants, and eats everything from street food to fine cuisine. The series regularly features Bronson's friends and fellow rappers, Meyhem Lauren, Alchemist, and Big Body Bes, as well as numerous world-renowned chefs. Four seasons have aired on cable television, with the fourth season airing from May 11, 2020, to July 20, 2020.

In March 2021, Bronson announced the fifth season of Fuck, That's Delicious as a fully independent and self-funded production, no longer airing on Viceland, nor having Alchemist, Meyhem and Bes regularly appearing. Unlike the past four seasons, which saw Bronson visiting restaurants, this season explores his current lifestyle of fitness, while also showcasing some of his own cooking, particularly for his friends. The fifth season's first episode premiered on Bronson's YouTube channel on March 17, 2021.

Development 
Fuck, That's Delicious began as a web series under Vice Media's "Munchies" banner. The series can be seen as a spiritual successor to Bronson's previous food web series Action in the Kitchen.

Notable celebrities, from the food industry and otherwise, who have appeared on Fuck, That's Delicious include Daniel Boulud, Michael Voltaggio, Michael White, Mario Batali,  Steve Bunce and Jonah Hill.

Episodes

Series overview

Season 1 (2016)

Season 2 (2016–17)

Season 3 (2018)

Season 4 (2020)

Season 5 (2021)

References

External links 
 Fuck, That's Delicious IMDB Page
 Fuck, That's Delicious Munchies page
 Fuck, That's Delicious Viceland show page

2016 web series debuts
2016 American television series debuts
2010s American documentary television series
2021 American television series endings
2021 web series endings